Strigoplus is a genus of spiders in the family Thomisidae. It was first described in 1885 by Simon. , it contains 5 species from Asia.

References

Thomisidae
Araneomorphae genera
Spiders of Asia